Ante Trstenjak (29 December 1894 – 4 December 1970) was a Slovenian, psychologist, painter and illustrator. He used mostly watercolour and oils. The art gallery in Ljutomer is named after him. He was born in Slamnjak.

Paintings
 Deklica (Girl)
 Tihožitje (Still Life)
 Oljke na Rabu (Olive Trees on Rab)

External links

References 
 Slovenski veliki leksikon, Mladinska knjiga (2003)

1894 births
1970 deaths
People from the Municipality of Ljutomer
Slovenian male painters
Slovenian psychologists
20th-century Slovenian painters
20th-century Slovenian male artists
20th-century psychologists